The 2017 SC Waterloo Region season was the seventh season in the club's participation in the Canadian Soccer League. They began the season on May 26, 2017 in an away match against Serbian White Eagles FC. The season concluded with Waterloo securing a postseason berth by finishing seventh in the standings. In the preliminary rounds of the playoffs they were defeated in a penalty shootout against Serbian White Eagles.

Summary 
After competing in the CSL Second Division for the 2016 season they returned to the First Division with former player Stefan Ristic managing the team. The organization still maintained a reserve team in the Second Division. Former veterans like Vladimir Zelenbaba, Drazen Vukovic, and Adis Hasecic returned for the 2017 season. Throughout the season Waterloo struggled to achieve sufficient results, but to managed to qualify for the postseason. Their playoff run came to quick conclusion in the first round after a defeat in a penalty shootout to the Serbian White Eagles. Their reserve squad also secured a postseason berth, but were eliminated in the playoff quarterfinals by FC Vorkuta B.

Competitions

Canadian Soccer League

League table

First Division

Results summary

Results by round

Matches

League table

Second Division

Results summary

Results by round

Goals and assists 
Correct as of November 30, 2017

References  

SC Waterloo Region
SC Waterloo Region
SC Waterloo Region seasons